Uniform information representation  allows information from several realms or disciplines to be displayed and worked with as if it came from the same realm or discipline.  It takes information from a number of sources, which may have used different methodologies and metrics in their data collection, and builds a single large collection of information, where some records may be more complete than others across all fields of data

Uniform information representation is particularly important in the fields of Enterprise Information Integration (EII) and Electronic Data Interchange (EDI), where different departments of a large organization may have collected information for different purposes, with different labels and units, until one department realized that data already collected by those other departments could be re-purposed for their own needs—saving the enterprise the effort and cost of re-collecting the same information.

Data management